Samuel Irving "S.I." Newhouse Jr. (November 8, 1927 – October 1, 2017) was an American heir to a substantial magazine and media business. Together with his brother Donald, he owned Advance Publications, founded by their late father in 1922, whose properties include Condé Nast (publisher of such magazines as Vogue, Vanity Fair, and The New Yorker), dozens of newspapers across the United States (including The Star-Ledger, The Plain Dealer, and The Oregonian), former cable company Bright House Networks, and a controlling stake in Discovery Communications.

Early life
He was the son of Mitzi (née Epstein) and Samuel Irving Newhouse Sr., the founder of Advance Publications. Sam Newhouse Sr. had been the young editor of the Bayonne Times and when he asked the owner of the Times for a raise he had long deserved, he was refused. Sam then quit the Times to become associated with the Staten Island paper that formed the basis of his publication future. Newhouse attended the Horace Mann School in New York City. He later attended Syracuse University, but dropped out and began working at his father's newspapers.

Career
After dropping out of Syracuse University, Newhouse worked for the International News Service in Paris. He served two years in the U.S. Air Force before going to Harrisburg, Pennsylvania to oversee two of his father's daily newspapers. In 1964, he became publisher of the U.S. edition of Vogue and in 1975, he took over as chairman of Condé Nast. In 1985, he purchased the New Yorker.

Prior to his death, he had an estimated net worth of $9.5 billion, and he was ranked the 46th richest American by Forbes magazine in 2014.

Newhouse gave money to charity, including $15 million to Syracuse University in 1962. He was also an art collector, who at one time owned one of the most valuable paintings in the world, a Jackson Pollock drip painting, titled No. 5, 1948. Newhouse was listed by Art News as among the top 200 art collectors in the world.

Personal life and death
Newhouse was Jewish. He was married to Jane Franke from 1951 to 1959, and they had three children, Samuel I. Newhouse III, Wynn Newhouse (died 2010), and Pamela Newhouse Mensch. His parents were deeply disappointed by the divorce. In 1973, he married Victoria Carrington Benedict de Ramel. His grandson, S.I. Newhouse IV, appeared in the documentary Born Rich.

Newhouse died on October 1, 2017, at the age of 89.

References

Further reading

 
 

 
 

 

1927 births
2017 deaths
Businesspeople from New York City
American art collectors
American billionaires
American mass media owners
American newspaper publishers (people)
American people of Austrian-Jewish descent
American people of Belarusian-Jewish descent
Jewish American philanthropists
Philanthropists from New York (state)
Condé Nast people
Horace Mann School alumni
People from Manhattan
Samuel Irving Jr.
20th-century American businesspeople